Fred Stürmer (25 October 1927 – 6 November 2014) was a Luxembourgian boxer. He competed in the men's middleweight event at the 1952 Summer Olympics. At the 1952 Summer Olympics, he lost to Boris Nikolov of Bulgaria.

References

1927 births
2014 deaths
Luxembourgian male boxers
Olympic boxers of Luxembourg
Boxers at the 1952 Summer Olympics
People from Dudelange
Middleweight boxers